Royal Revenge is a Nancy Drew and Hardy Boys Supermystery crossover novel, published in 1997.

Plot summary
Nancy Drew becomes suspicious of Bess's new boyfriend, Cass Carroll, who clearly has a deep, dark secret. Cass is from a close-knit Panaslavan community settled in River Heights. Panaslava is a war-torn country with a bitter past, whose expatriates are wary and tight-lipped. Meanwhile, the Hardys are on the trail of a gun for hire whose target is the exiled prince of Panaslava. When the Hardys discover that the target's current location is at Little Panaslava, River Heights, the trio put the pieces together, and uncover the shocking truth.

References

External links
 Royal Revenge at Fantastic Fiction
Supermystery series books

Supermystery
1997 American novels
1997 children's books